Augustus Francis Fechteler (1 September 1857 – 26 May 1921) was a Rear Admiral of the United States Navy during World War I. He had two sons also served in the Navy, Admiral William Fechteler was Chief of Naval Operations and Lieutenant Frank Caspar Fechteler, an early naval aviator that died in an airplane crash 18 September 1922.

Early life
Augustus Francis Fechteler, born in Paderborn, Prussia (now Germany) 1 September 1857. His family emigrated to the United States in 1865.

Naval service
He was appointed Cadet Midshipman to the US Naval Academy by the Honorable Thomas J. Creamer, Member of Congress from the Seventh District of New York in June 1873, and completed the course on 20 June 1877.

On 10 January 1889, he reported to the Bureau of Navigation, Navy department, Washington, DC, and a year later was transferred to the Office of Naval Intelligence where he remained until January 1892.

He completed that period of sea duty in October 1894, and for a year thereafter was in charge of the Branch Hydrographic Office, San Francisco, California. From October 1895 to August 1896, he was in charge of Inspection of Ships, and on 19 September, joined . He remained aboard that gunboat, on Asiatic Station, until August 1899, when he joined  for transportation back to Mare Island, California. There he served as Aide to the Commandant until 15 August 1901.

He then returned to the Office of Naval Intelligence, Navy Department, where he served during the year following. In May 1905, he went to New York to inspect , and commanded her from her commissioning until 22 December 1906.

He attended the Conference of Officers at the Naval War College, Newport, Rhode Island, resuming his inspection duties in September 1908. When detached in November 1911, he was designated President of the Board of Inspection and Survey (for ships), and from 18 December, that year, he had additional temporary duty in connection with battleship plans to the General Board, Navy Department.

He attended a course at the Naval War College from November 1914 until Jul 1915, when he was ordered to Provincetown, Massachusetts, to assume command of the Second Division, Atlantic Fleet, under the Commander in Chief, and on 24 July, he was commissioned Rear Admiral, to date from 11 July 1915.

On 5 February 1918, he assumed the duties of Commandant, Norfolk Navy Yard, Virginia, and remained in that assignment throughout the latter months of the war and until 10 April 1919. He was awarded the Navy Cross and cited as follows:  “For exceptionally meritorious service in a duty of great responsibility as Division Commander, Sixth Division of the Atlantic Fleet, and later as Commandant of the Navy Yard, Norfolk, Virginia.”

Transferred to duty as Commandant of the Fifth Naval District, with headquarters at Norfolk, Virginia, he reported on 10 April 1919. He died on 26 May 1921, at the Naval Operating Base, Hampton Roads, Virginia.

Awards
 Navy Cross
 Spanish Campaign Medal
 Philippine Campaign Medal
 World War I Victory Medal

Navy Cross citation

Notes 

Citations

Bibliography 

Online resources

External links 

 Arlington National Cemetery
 Augustus F. Fechteler's Logbook of the U.S.S. Trenton, 1877–1879, MS 78 held by Special Collections & Archives, Nimitz Library at the United States Naval Academy

1857 births
1921 deaths
Military personnel from Paderborn
United States Naval Academy alumni
Burials at Arlington National Cemetery
United States Navy rear admirals
Recipients of the Navy Cross (United States)